Lady To Ladies is a tribute album by Amii Stewart released in 1994. The album includes songs made famous by other female singers, among them Nina Simone, Annie Lennox, Tina Turner, Donna Summer, Barbra Streisand, Diana Ross, Aretha Franklin, Patti LaBelle, Roberta Flack and Chaka Khan. "Why" was at a later point re-recorded as a duet with Randy Crawford and issued as a single.

Track listing
"My Baby Just Cares for Me" - 3:48 
"Why" - 4:13 
"Got to Be Real" - 4:03 
"Private Dancer" - 4:36 
"MacArthur Park" - 6:05 
"The Way We Were" - 3:13 
Medley: "You Are My Sunshine" (1:06) / "Natural Woman" (1:05) / "Dr. Feelgood" (2:57) / "Respect" (1:36) - 6:44 
"Theme from Mahogany (Do You Know Where You're Going To?) - 3:27 
"You Belong to Me" - 3:34 
"Lady Marmalade" - 3:30 
"Killing Me Softly With His Song" - 4:15 
"Ain't Nobody" 3:50

Personnel
 Amii Stewart - vocals

Production
 M. Natale - producer

1994 albums
Amii Stewart albums
Tribute albums